Martin John Reed (born 10 January 1978) is an English former professional footballer who played as a defender in the Football League for York City, and in non-League football for Scarborough.

References

External links

1978 births
Living people
Sportspeople from Scarborough, North Yorkshire
Footballers from North Yorkshire
English footballers
Association football defenders
York City F.C. players
Scarborough F.C. players
English Football League players
National League (English football) players